The Vizovice Highlands is an area of relatively modest but rugged highlands within the Zlín Region of the Czech Republic, named after the town of Vizovice.

Geologically, the highlands are part of the Slovak-Moravian Carpathians in the Outer Western Carpathians.

The highest peak of the Vizovice Highlands is Klášťov, at 753 meters above sea level. The entire mountainous region covers an area of approx. 1399 square kilometers, and has an average elevation of 339 meters above sea level. The primary composition of the range is Carpathian flysch.

The Dřevnice River, among others, originates here, and the towns include Vizovice, Zlin, Uherský Brod, and the spa town of Luhačovice.

Mountain ranges of the Czech Republic
Mountain ranges of the Western Carpathians
Geography of the Zlín Region
Highlands
Zlín District